John P. Garfield (born October 6, 1949) is a former member of the Michigan House of Representatives.

Early life and education
Garfield was born on October 6, 1949. Garfield attended the University of Maryland.

Career
Garfield worked as a carpenter and an electrical estimator. Garfield served on the Oakland County Board of Commissioners. On November 5, 2002, Garfield was elected to the Michigan House of Representatives where he represented the 45th district from January 8, 2003 to December 31, 2008. During his time in the legislature, Garfield resided in Rochester Hills, Michigan.

Personal life
In September 2005, Garfield was arrested for drunk driving. In the Oakland County 52-4 District Court in Troy, Michigan, Garfield entered a guilty plea, and entered himself into rehabilitation for alcoholism and pain medication misuse.

References

Living people
1949 births
County commissioners in Michigan
Driving under the influence
University System of Maryland alumni
People from Rochester Hills, Michigan
Republican Party members of the Michigan House of Representatives
21st-century American politicians